This is a list of Pennsylvania State Historical Markers which were first placed by the Commonwealth of Pennsylvania in 1914 and are currently overseen by the Pennsylvania Historical and Museum Commission (PHMC) as part of its Historical Markers Program. Since the modern PHMC program began in 1946, there have been over 2,000 historical sites in all 67 Pennsylvania counties that are marked by an official Pennsylvania state historical marker.

History

The Historical Markers Program was authorized by the Commonwealth of Pennsylvania when it created Pennsylvania Historical Commission (PHC), the precursor of the Pennsylvania Historical and Museum Commission (PHMC), through the Act of the General Assembly No. 777, on July 25, 1913. The PHC was empowered to mark by proper monuments, tablets, or markers, places or buildings within the Commonwealth where historical events transpired.

The earliest markers were bronze plaques often mounted on large stones gathered from the Pennsylvania countryside. Philadelphia architect Paul Philippe Cret (1876-1945) designed later bronze plaques that included the state's coat of arms with text laid out within a rectangular double border. Starting in 1945, markers were cast of aluminum, used gold-colored text of raised characters on a deep blue background within a silver-colored frame, and were initially affixed to concrete posts, so as to be more easily seen by motorists alongside roads. Eventually smaller and narrower city markers were added for their better suitability in urban settings.

Listings of markers by county
The following are approximate tallies of current marker listings in Pennsylvania by county. These counts are based on entries in the Pennsylvania Historical and Museum Commission's database as of August, 2020. There are yearly additions to the listings and some markers may be missing or stolen. (Approved markers)

See also

 National Register of Historic Places listings in Pennsylvania
 ArcGIS Data of markers - 1910 - 2010

References

External links

Pennsylvania Historical Marker Program
Pennsylvania Historical & Museum Commission
ExplorePAhistory.com, a collaborative effort of the PHMC and WITF